Actinoleuca campbelli bountyensis is a subspecies of sea snail or true limpet, a marine  gastropod mollusc in the family Lottiidae.

References

 Powell A. W. B., William Collins Publishers Ltd, Auckland 1979 

Lottiidae
Gastropods of New Zealand
Gastropods described in 1955